Omoowa Omoregie is a Nigerian taekwondo practitioner who competes in the women's senior category. She won a bronze medal at the 2009 African Taekwondo Championships in the –53 kg category.

Sports career 
Omoregie participated in the 53 kg  at the 2009 African Taekwondo Championship that held in Yaoundé, coming 3rd, she earned a bronze medal.

References 

Year of birth missing (living people)
Living people
Nigerian female taekwondo practitioners
21st-century Nigerian women